Caldwell Tidicue, better known as Bob the Drag Queen, is an American drag queen, comedian, actor, activist, musician, and reality television personality. He is best known for winning the eighth season of RuPaul's Drag Race. As of 2020, he has more than one million followers on Instagram and was the first Black Drag Race queen to reach the milestone. After Drag Race, he pursued acting, appearing in television shows such as High Maintenance (2016), Tales of the City (2019), and A Black Lady Sketch Show (2019). In 2020, he began co-hosting We're Here on HBO alongside fellow Drag Race contestants Eureka O'Hara and Shangela.

Early life
Bob the Drag Queen was born to Martha Caldwell in 1986 with the last name "Caldwell", which he later incorporated into the professional name "Caldwell Tidicue". He was born in 1986 in Columbus, Georgia. He moved a lot as a kid, which included Phenix City, Alabama, Corinth, Mississippi, LaGrange, Georgia and Atlanta, Georgia. He was raised in Clayton County, Georgia.Caldwell explained, "You can call it the hood. You can say it. That's where I'm from." His mother owned a drag bar in Columbus, Georgia. On the nights that she could not afford a babysitter, she brought Caldwell to the drag bar, where he would work and collect money from the patrons.

Caldwell has described his mother as a supportive early influence on his life. He explained, "I also grew up with a mom who told me I could do anything, so I was like, 'Y'all don't even know how  I am.' My mom was one of the moms who was like, 'You are so handsome why aren't you modeling? I am handsome, but model... let's not get crazy." Bob has also been influenced by several other drag queens, such as Peppermint, Bianca Del Rio, BeBe Zahara Benet, and her Sibling Rivalry co-host Monét X Change.

As a teenager, Caldwell attended Morrow High School in Ellenwood, Georgia. He then went back to Columbus to study theater at Columbus State University. He first appeared in drag when he attended a lesbian party during Pride Month 2008.

When Caldwell was 22 years old, he moved to Queens, New York with $500 and two suitcases. He originally intended to become an actor and standup comedian. Before becoming a drag queen, Caldwell worked in children's theater for years and "always found children to be a source of joy for [him]."

Career

2009–2015: Drag career beginnings

In the summer of 2009, Caldwell started doing drag, after watching the first season of RuPaul's Drag Race on TiVo. He explained that he "became obsessed" with the show and it immediately inspired him to order a TK-7 makeup kit off of the Ben Nye website. Since his first presentations, his character was focused on stand-up comedy routines, and he started lip-syncing after a couple of months into his drag. His initial stage name was Kittin Withawhip, which was a reference to Kitten with a Whip (1964), a film that starred Ann-Margret. He was featured in Leland Bobbé's Half Drag Series with his name. In his early drag career, Caldwell would perform with a nine-foot bullwhip.

In the beginning of his career, Caldwell faced challenges as a drag queen. As he described, "It did not make me money or get me gigs. It cost me a lot. I did this competition every Thursday. Then another one on Wednesday. And another on Tuesday. I never won any of them. Ever. After a few years, I finally won one. It was really addictive and fun doing competitions."

In 2013, Caldwell officially changed his stage name to Bob the Drag Queen. As he explained, at a karaoke hosting gig, "The guy goes, 'Give it up for your host... Kate. But she made light of the moment, reintroducing herself as 'Kate the Drag Queen,' then 'Kim the Drag Queen' throughout the evening. Then at the end of the night, I was like, 'Give it up for... Bob the Drag Queen.' And I was like, 'That sounds really funny.'"

2016–2019: RuPaul's Drag Race Season 8

On February 1, 2016, Bob the Drag Queen was revealed as a cast member on the eighth season of RuPaul's Drag Race. On the show, he was noted for his focus on comedy. During the show, he won three challenges, including the recurring "Snatch Game" (where he portrayed Crazy Eyes, as played by Uzo Aduba, and Carol Channing). On the season's eighth episode, Bob "lipsynced for her life" against Derrick Barry and won. On May 16, 2016, Bob was crowned the winner of the season and received a cash prize of $100,000.

In June 2019, a panel of judges from New York magazine placed Bob eighth on their list of "the most powerful drag queens in America", a ranking of 100 former Drag Race contestants.

2020–Present: We're Here 
In 2020, he began co-hosting We're Here on HBO alongside fellow Drag Race contestants Eureka O'Hara and Shangela. In the series, the trio of drag queens travel across the United States to recruit small-town residents to participate in one-night-only drag shows. After premiering on April 23, 2020, the series was renewed for a second season, which premiered on October 11, 2021. In December 2021, the series was renewed for a third season. The series has received acclaim from critics.

Other ventures 
In 2016, shortly after winning Drag Race, Bob released the single "Purse First" featuring DJ Mitch Ferrino. Also in 2016, he appeared in the music video for MC Frontalot's "Mornings Come and Go". He also collaborated with Alaska Thunderfuck on the single "Yet Another Dig" in 2017, and contributed to the compilation album Christmas Queens 3 (2017). He collaborated with Shangela for a Christmas theme song, "Deck A Ho" in December 2017.

On March 15, 2018, Bob debuted the podcast Sibling Rivalry with his drag sister Monét X Change as co-host and produced by DJ Mitch Ferrino. On April 2, 2018, a video version of the podcast was uploaded to YouTube.

Bob appeared as a guest co-host alongside Trixie Mattel on The Trixie & Katya Show, filling in for regular co-host Katya during her hiatus. Her TV comedy special, Bob the Drag Queen: Suspiciously Large Woman, aired on Logo in July 2017.

Bob played the role of Belize in Berkeley Rep’s production of Angels in America from April to July 2018.

In November 2019, Bob was interviewed by KMVT about a one-time drag event hosted in Twin Falls, a show highlighting local drag queens and introducing international drag talent to Magic Valley. This event was filmed as part of Tidicue's HBO show We're Here (2020).

Bob's second comedy special, Bob The Drag Queen: Crazy Black Lady, aired on OutTV in Canada in 2020.

Bob also writes jokes for other drag queens including Trinity the Tuck, Ginger Minj, and Monét X Change.

In March 2020, Bob performed alongside fellow drag race alumni BeBe Zahara Benet, The Vixen, Monique Heart, Peppermint, and Shea Couleé in the Nubia tour, a live drag show featuring and produced by Black drag queens.

Bob is a co-founder of Black Queer Town Hall along with Peppermint. The inaugural event featured speakers such as Laverne Cox and Angela Davis and raised over $150,000.

In May 2021, Bob was featured in Coach New York's "Pride is Where You Find It" campaign.

Bob is an LGBT activist and spoke on RuPaul's Drag Race of a moment when he was protesting for LGBT rights and was arrested in drag.

Bob is the drag mother of Miz Cracker and drag sister to Monét X Change, who placed fifth and sixth, respectively, on season 10 of RuPaul's Drag Race, with X Change going on to win RuPaul's Drag Race All Stars season 4 and Cracker placing as runner-up on RuPaul's Drag Race All Stars season 5.

Bob will be the opening act of the upcoming Madonna: The Celebration Tour in 2023.

Personal life
Bob identifies as pansexual and non-binary and goes by either he/him or she/her pronouns.

Bob has been sober for 14 years.

Discography

Extended plays

Singles

As lead artist

As featured artist

Other appearances

Filmography

Television

Film

Audio series

Web series

Music videos

As lead artist or director

Featured and cameo roles

Theatre

Awards and nominations

See also
 LGBT culture in New York City
 List of LGBT people from New York City

Notes

References

External links

 
 
 
 Bob the Drag Queen on TikTok
 Bob the Drag Queen on Stereo App
 
 
 

1986 births
Living people
African-American drag queens
American drag queens
American non-binary actors
American podcasters
LGBT African Americans
LGBT people from Georgia (U.S. state)
American LGBT rights activists
LGBT YouTubers
Non-binary drag performers
People from Columbus, Georgia
RuPaul's Drag Race winners
Pansexual musicians
20th-century American LGBT people
21st-century American LGBT people
Non-binary activists
Polyamorous people
Pansexual non-binary people